Yolanda Carolina Falcón Lizaraso (born October 9, 1959) is a lawyer and official from Peru. She was an agent from the Defensoría del Pueblo of the regions La Libertad and Callao and Ensured's Defender of Seguro Social de Salud del Perú. Since 1983, she has worked as a lawyer and specializes in the defense of rights, management conflict and public health.

Education 
Lizaraso studied law at the Universidad Nacional de Trujillo, where she graduated in 1983. She had further studies in Health Management and Social Management that allowed her to hold public office in the Peruvian capital and provinces.

Public work 

After graduating from college, she began her career as a litigator in 1997 that would allow her to assume the leadership of the office of the Defensoría del Pueblo del Perú in the region of La Libertad. For 12 years, she assumed the tasks of defending citizens' rights, managing social conflicts and combating violence. In 2009, she moved to the Callao, where she led the ombudsman's office in taking measures for this population addressing claims chalacos 1.5 million and 100 thousand citizens of Huaral and Barranca for 3 years.

In 2012, she joined the ranks of the Social Health Insurance Peru EsSalud insured as Advocate and Central Insured Service Manager attending claims 11 million users working closely with Peruvian journalists and opinion leaders to overcome the shortcomings in hospital care of patients.

References

External links 
  UNT RINDIÓ HOMENAJE A INVESTIGADOR PERCY FALCÓN.
  Descubren miles de cédulas marcadas a favor de Fujimori.
  Gobierno Regional del Callao dispone medidas urgentes para proteger humedales de Ventanilla.
 EsSalud crea Gerencia Central de Atención al Asegurado ¿Mejorará el servicio?.
  6 mujeres cada mes son víctimas de feminicidio.
  Defensoría del Asegurado de EsSalud realiza implementación de registro de intervenciones.

1959 births
Living people
Peruvian women lawyers
20th-century Peruvian lawyers
21st-century Peruvian lawyers